Fox is a locality in the Australian state of South Australia located in the state's south-east within the Limestone Coast region about  south east of the state capital of Adelaide and about  south-west of the municipal seat of Naracoorte.

Boundaries for the locality were created and was given the name of Fox on 3 December 1998. The name is derived from the cadastral unit of the  Hundred of Fox  in which the locality is located.  The hundred itself was named after Arthur Aloysius Fox who served one term in the South Australian House of Assembly.

The 2016 Australian census which was conducted in August 2016 reports that Fox had a population of 53 people.

Fox is located within the federal division of Barker, the state electoral district of MacKillop and the local government area of  the Naracoorte Lucindale Council.

See also
Fox (disambiguation)

References

Limestone Coast